Dzherakh (Žyajraxoj), exonym: Erokhan people — 
historical Ingush ethnoterritorial society,:  that was formed in the Dzheyrakhin gorge, as well as in the area of the lower reaches of the Armkhi River and the upper reaches of the Terek River.

 History 
The first mention of Dzherakhs was in 16th century, in Russian documents as Erokhan people'' The Dzherakhs were also mentioned by Georgian prince, historian and geographer, Vakhushti Bagrationi in 1745.

The first contact of Dzherakhs with Russians was in 1833, during the punitive expedition on Mountainous Ingushetia, done by general Abkhazov.

Composition 
The following villages belonged to the Dzherakh society: Dzheyrakh, Pkhamat, Furtoug, Tamariani, Ezmi. From these villages came the ancient teip of Dzheyrakh, which included patronymics, which later became independent princely teips:

 Akhrievs
 Borovs 
 Lyanovs
 Khamatkhanovs
 Tsurovs

References

Bibliography 
 
 
 
 
 
 
 

Ingush societies